Mohammad Hossein Jalali is an Iranian military official who served as minister of defense.

Career
Jalali was appointed minister of defense in October 1985 to the cabinet headed by Prime Minister Mir Hossein Mousavi. He replaced Mohammad Salimi as defense minister. Jalali was in office until August 1989.

Jalali was a brigadier general and the commander of the Aerospace Force of the Islamic Revolutionary Guard Corps. He was appointed to this post in January 1992, replacing Hossein Dehghan. In November 1997, Mohammad Bagher Ghalibaf replaced Jalali as commander of the air wing of the IRGC. Then Jalali was appointed by Ali Khamenei as deputy chief of staff of the armed forces for logistics, research and industry.

References

External links

1936 births
Defence ministers of Iran
Islamic Revolutionary Guard Corps brigadier generals
Living people